Renée Lippin (born July 26, 1946) is a retired American actress. She appeared periodically on The Bob Newhart Show as Michelle Nardo, one of Dr. Hartley's patients on the television series. Lippin also guest starred on several other television series as well as appearing in feature films in the 1970s to 1990s. She and her husband, Dr. Allan Leicht, have three children.

Filmography

References

External links
 
 
 

1946 births
Actresses from New York City
Living people
American television actresses
American film actresses
20th-century American actresses
20th-century American Jews
21st-century American Jews
21st-century American women